National Route 144 is a national highway of Japan connecting Naganohara, Gunma and Ueda, Nagano in Japan, with a total length of 45.3 km (28.15 mi).

References

144
Roads in Gunma Prefecture
Roads in Nagano Prefecture